Killarney is a neighbourhood in East Vancouver, British Columbia with a population of over 28,000 in 2011 and lies in the far southeast corner of the city. It is on the south slope of the ridge that rises above the Fraser River, and contains a collection of single-family residences with a few multi-family homes as well as the townhouses and high-rises of the Fraserlands development along the river.

Geography 
The Killarney neighbourhood, which contains the area known as Champlain Heights, runs north from the Fraser River to its north border along East 41st Avenue and Kingsway, and stretches from Boundary Road, Vancouver's eastern border with Burnaby, British Columbia, to a line including Elliott Street and Vivian Drive on the western border. The neighbourhood is mostly built on the slope of the rise from the Fraser River, facing southward across Richmond, and is focused around Rupert Street (which merges with Kerr Street near 49th Avenue).

The neighbourhood contains a number of green spaces that are reflective of its history as one of the last areas to be developed in the Vancouver area.

History 
The Killarney area was one of the last portions of Vancouver to be developed, and was mostly second-growth forest until after World War II. Farms had been cut out of the forest since 1868, when William Rowling, a surveyor in the British military, was given a land grant that eventually consisted of much of southern Killarney, including all of its riverfront land. George Wales was the first to settle in northern Killarney in 1878, and eventually development began to move from the more populated areas to the west as the interurban streetcar line was constructed north of Kingsway.

After World War II, development accelerated with a growing need for housing, and the street grid moved south towards Southeast Marine Drive. In the 1970s, Champlain Heights was developed as a comprehensive residential development.

As a later developing neighbourhood, Killarney does not have the same level of heritage properties as other areas in Vancouver, though it does boast a number of examples of 1920s farmhouses and is well known for long-standing trees and natural heritage.

In the 1990s, the land along the Fraser River was a hotbed of development. Known as the Fraserlands, this area now boasts hundreds of townhome units and a number of residential highrise buildings in a new high density neighbourhood called the River District, with more presently under construction. The city of Vancouver has recently begun consultations on the possible development of a former log yard at the eastern end of the Fraserlands, with the intention of developing it into a sustainable community of its own.

Demographics

Features 

Killarney is well populated with parks and green spaces, reflecting its forest history. The largest is Everett Crowley Park, along Kerr Street and north of Marine Drive; this park was originally a forested area with a ravine and waterfall that was used as a landfill for many years before being closed and reclaimed to its present form. Across Kerr is the Fraserview Golf Course, which also includes a number of trails. Killarney Park is now the location of Killarney Secondary School and a Community Centre, which features a swimming pool, is built on a reclaimed bog. There is also a Community Centre in Champlain Heights, near a commercial sector at the corner of East 54th and Kerr. A trail runs along the Fraser River through green space stretching along the riverfront. It also features a newly constructed Olympic ice rink for the 2010 Winter Olympics.
The music video of Canadian singer Michael Bublé's song "Haven't Met You Yet" was shot in Killarney Market at the corner of East 49th Avenue and Elliott Street in Killarney. After 25 years as a family-owned grocer, Killarney Market was sold to another local independent retailer in 2018. The location is now known as 88 Supermarket.

Notes

References

External links 
City of Vancouver - Killarney
Killarney/Champlain Heights at discovervancouver.com
Killarney Community Centre

Neighbourhoods in Vancouver